Edward Lynn "Ed" Thompson (born November 24, 1950) is an American insurance agent and politician. He has represented the 29th District in the Texas House of Representatives since 2013. A member of the Republican Party, Thompson also serves as an insurance agent with State Farm since 1982.

Education and career
Thompson earned a Bachelor of Business Administration in Finance at the University of Houston, before moving to Pearland, Texas. Since then and before becoming a state legislature, he served on the Pearland City Council, the Pearland Economic Development Corporation, the Chairman of the Pearland Chamber, and Trustee of the Pearland Independent School District.

References

External links
 Campaign website
 State legislative page

1950 births
Living people
Republican Party members of the Texas House of Representatives
21st-century American politicians
University of Houston alumni
People from Pearland, Texas
American businesspeople in insurance